The 1984 European Weightlifting Championships were held in Vitoria, Spain from April 26 to May 1, 1984. This was the 63rd edition of the event. There were 142 men in action from 26 nations.

Medal summary

Medal table
Ranking by Big (Total result) medals

References
Results (Chidlovski.net)
Панорама спортивного года 1984 / Сост. В. Л. Штейнбах — М.: Физкультура и спорт, 1985. 

European Weightlifting Championships
European Weightlifting Championships
European Weightlifting Championships
International weightlifting competitions hosted by Spain
Sport in Vitoria-Gasteiz
April 1984 sports events in Europe